Winning Eleven Online is a MMO football video game based on the Pro Evolution Soccer series, hosted on Naver. It is only available in South Korea and it is not known if there are plans to release it elsewhere. The game uses the engine's PS2 games and somehow for older PES engine.

It was announced that this game would be shut down on December 26, 2013, and a sequel, Winning Eleven Online 2014, has been released in Korea.

See also
 FIFA Online 3

References

External links
 Naver WEO official website 

2012 video games
Pro Evolution Soccer
Association football video games
Massively multiplayer online games
Windows games
Windows-only games
Inactive massively multiplayer online games
Video games developed in South Korea